Herein is the discography of the American hip hop group Grandmaster Flash and the Furious Five. Additional info can be found on the separate Grandmaster Flash and Melle Mel entries.

Albums

Studio

Compilations

During the disbandment

Grandmaster Flash

Grandmaster Melle Mel and the Furious Five

Singles

During the disbandment

Grandmaster Flash

Grandmaster Melle Mel and the Furious Five

References

Hip hop discographies
Discographies of American artists